William Burton (born 15 September 1941) is an Australian former swimmer. He competed in two events at the 1960 Summer Olympics.

References

External links
 

1941 births
Living people
Australian male breaststroke swimmers
Olympic swimmers of Australia
Swimmers at the 1960 Summer Olympics
Swimmers at the 1962 British Empire and Commonwealth Games
Commonwealth Games medallists in swimming
Commonwealth Games silver medallists for Australia
People from North Queensland
20th-century Australian people
Medallists at the 1962 British Empire and Commonwealth Games